The 1944–45 season was Stoke City's tenth season in the non-competitive War League.

In 1939 World War II was declared and the Football League was cancelled. In its place were formed War Leagues and cups, based on geographical lines rather than based on previous league placement. However, none of these were considered to be competitive football, and thus their records are not recognised by the Football League and thus not included in official records.

Season review
Tommy Sale now entering the twilight zone of his eventful career again went goal crazy in the 1944–45 season, scoring 34 goals in 40 appearances. In league action, neighbours Port Vale were taken for 14 goals, Stoke winning 8–1 at home and 6–2 away all in the space of eight days (17–24 February 1945) and indeed, during that months Stoke hit 24 times in just four matches. Overall Stoke's form was not that great despite being in fine goalscoring form and they took 11th place in the first phase and 17th in the second.

Results

Stoke's score comes first

Legend

Football League North 1st Phase

Football League North 2nd Phase

Football League War Cup

Squad statistics

References

Stoke City F.C. seasons
Stoke City